Who Dunit is an Exidy light gun arcade game released in 1988.

Summary
In this shooting game, the player was to guide a character through a mysterious mansion to find a key to open a trunk in the attic. Using the light gun, the player had to guide and protect this character from dangers that range from ghosts, falling objects, and even pimps as he walks through each room.

References

1988 video games
Arcade video games
Arcade-only video games
Exidy games
Light gun games
Video games developed in the United States